First Presbyterian Manse, also known as the Lavinia E. Porter House, is a historic home located at Niagara Falls in Niagara County, New York.  It was built about 1849 and is a two-story, stucco covered, square brick dwelling in the Italianate style. It has a projecting full-height entrance and a rear addition. It has a low pitched gable roof with deep overhanging eaves and decorative brackets. The house was last renovated in 1927–1931. The home is associated with Lavinia E. Porter, daughter of Judge Augustus Porter (1769–1849). From its construction, it housed the manse for the local Presbyterian church.

It was listed on the National Register of Historic Places in 2012.

References

Houses on the National Register of Historic Places in New York (state)
Houses completed in 1849
Italianate architecture in New York (state)
Houses in Niagara County, New York
1849 establishments in New York (state)
National Register of Historic Places in Niagara County, New York
Italianate church buildings in the United States